Mongaguá is a municipality in the state of São Paulo in Brazil. It is part of the Metropolitan Region of Baixada Santista. The population is 57,648 (2020 est.) in an area of 141.87 km2. The name comes from the Tupi language. Its seal carries the national motto of the United States of America, E pluribus unum.

The municipality's street plan is on a planned grid running from SSE to NNW and many of the houses are within sight of the Atlantic Ocean. The populated area of Mongaguá is near the bottom of steep-sloping and densely forested mountains. The BR-101 superhighway linking Santos and the southern part of the state runs through Mongaguá. The freeway to the city of São Paulo is also easily accessible. Housing developments near the beaches were built in the 1970s and the 1990s.  Prior to the construction of the housing developments, the population was mainly rural. Housing development continues to this day.

There are two aboriginal villages in Mongaguá: Aldeia Itaóca and Aguapéu, located in the Atlantic Mata reserve. The aboriginal community of Aguapéu conceived of the project Jaguatareí Nhemboé (Walking and Learning).

Population history

Mongaguá Fishing Pier
The concrete Mongaguá Fishing Pier (or Plataforma de Pesca Amadora de Mongaguá) is a long T-shaped structure that provides access to line fishing as well as being a popular surfing area.

Notable residents
Raul Seixas, the "Father of Brazilian Rock" was known to spend large amounts of time in Bairro Pedreira in Mongaguá where for years he rented a small bungalo as a songwriting studio. And since 2010, the Greek-Californian artist and musician Ithaka Darin Pappas has worked and resided in Mongaguá at his small art ranch called Recanto Akahti (or AkahtiLândia, Brazil). His insect-inspired photo and sculpture works from the project Aliens Of AkahtiLândia were all created in Mongaguá as well as the recording of his instrumental album, Voiceless Blue Raven, which included a song entitled "Monday In Mongaguá."

References

External links
  http://www.mongagua.sp.gov.br
  citybrazil.com.br
  Portal Nosso São Paulo

Baixada Santista
Populated coastal places in São Paulo (state)
Municipalities in São Paulo (state)